Melnitsa Animation Studio ("melnitsa" meaning "windmill") is one of the largest animation studios in Russia. Deutsche Welle called the studio the Walt Disney of Saint Petersburg. Alongside its animation projects, Melnitsa has an effort devoted to creating digital special effects for both animation projects and live-action films.

History
The studio traces its roots to several animated projects in the late 1990s, including television commercials, the short film Die Hard by Konstantin Bronzit (Grand Prix of the Annecy International Animated Film Festival, 1998), and the animated series "Global Bears Rescue" and "Technology", created for Poseidon Film Distributors Ltd.

In 1999, Melnitsa was formally established with backing from STV Film Company's Sergey Selyanov and led by Aleksandr Boyarsky. STV Film Company retains a 50% share of the studio. The newly formed studio's first project was Adventures in Oz (Приключения в Изумрудном Городе) for NTV-film (НТВ-кино), a four-part animation released in 2000.

In 2001, Melnitsa released its first 3D-animated project - the short film Good Morning (С добрым утром) by Denis Chernov. In 2002 Melnitsa released two short films by the famous animator and director Konstantin Bronzit: There Was an Old Lady for Scholastic Entertainment and the 3D-animated film The God.

In 2000, Melnitsa began work on the feature-length animated film Little Longnose (Карлик Нос) directed by Ilya Maksimov, based on the fairy tale of Wilhelm Hauff. The film premiered on March 20, 2003, reportedly becoming one of the first Russian animated feature film released to theatres in nearly 40 years.

On December 23, 2004, the feature film Alyosha Popovich and Tugarin Zmey (Алёша Попович и Тугарин Змей) was released, directed by Konstantin Bronzit. The film was completed on a $4 million budget, and took in about $1.7 million at the box office. This marked the beginning of Melnitsa's "The Three Bogatyrs" trilogy, and two more films were planned over the next several years.

In January 2005, at the 10th Open Russian Festival of Animated Film in Suzdal, the new short film by Konstantin Bronzit premiered, called Cat and Fox (Кот и Лиса).  Bronzit's film, based on a national Russian tale, was part of the huge government-sponsored project by Moscow-based Pilot studio called "Gora Samotsvetov" (Гора самоцветов).  The project, when complete, will consist of 52 13-minute films based on fairy tales from all of Russia's nationalities.

On March 15, 2006, the second film in the "3 Bogatyrs" trilogy was released, called Dobrynya Nikitich and Zmey Gorynych (Добрыня Никитич и Змей Горыныч), directed by Ilya Maksimov. It came on the heels of the animated blockbuster Prince Vladimir, which was released on February 22, 2006.

Luntik, an animated series launched in 2007, gathered a total of over 2 billion views on YouTube.

The third film in the trilogy, Ilya Muromets and Nightingale the Robber (Илья Муромец и Соловей Разбойник), was released on July 7, 2007, grossing $10 million on a $2 million budget and setting a record for Russia's domestic animation industry, later surpassed by the studio's Three Heroes on Distant Shores earning $26 million in 2012. The 2013 film Three Warriors On Far Shores again established a new record for Russian animation, grossing $31.5 million. The release of Krepost in 2015 led to some controversy in Poland, as it depicted a 17th-century battle between Russian and Polish armies.

The studio's 2007 short film Lavatory – Lovestory was nominated for the Academy Award for Best Animated Short Film, followed by a nomination for We Can't Live Without Cosmos in the same category during the 88th Academy Awards in 2016.

Filmography

Short Film

Full length

In Production

Full length

Serial cartoons

See also
History of Russian animation
List of animated feature films

References

External links

Official website of the "3 Bogatyrs" trilogy 
Interview with Konstantin Bronzit 
La monto da gemoj - some Gora samotsvetov (Gem Mountain) series with subtitles in Esperanto.

 
Russian animation studios
Mass media companies established in 1999
Russian brands
Companies based in Saint Petersburg
Film production companies of Russia
1999 establishments in Russia